Epeiromulona roseata is a moth of the subfamily Arctiinae, described by William D. Field in 1952. It is found in Mexico, Honduras, and Costa Rica.

Description
The length of the forewings is 5.5–7 mm. The forewings are very similar to E. phelina. The fringe is pale yellow. The hindwings are salmon-pink, usually without an apical black spot.

References

 

Lithosiini
Moths described in 1952